Palmdale is an incorporated city in Los Angeles County and California's 2nd largest desert city, after Lancaster, California.

Palmdale may also refer to:

Places
Australia
Palmdale, New South Wales, a suburb on the Central Coast of New South Wales

United States
Palmdale, Florida, an unincorporated area in Glades County, near Lake Okeechobee
Palmdale, Minnesota, an unincorporated area in Chisago County, near the Wisconsin state line
Palmdale, Pennsylvania, an unincorporated area in Dauphin County, near Hershey
Palmdale, California, a city in Los Angeles County, near Santa Clarita

Airports
Palmdale Regional Airport, a commercial passenger airport in Palmdale, California
Plant 42, a military installation in Palmdale, California

Music
"Palmdale", from the album Sell Your Dope by Afroman
Palmdale, a band formed in 2010 by Kay Hanley and Kevin Dotson